JKT48 single's members election is an annual event held by idol group JKT48 to determine the selected members who would participate in a single. It has been held annually since 2014. Originally held between March and May, since 2018 it is held between September and November.

As a result of the COVID-19 pandemic in Indonesia during most of 2020, the annual election was not held for the first time.

2014 

JKT48 6th Single's Members Election was a chain of annual event to determine the selected members who would participate in the JKT48's 6th single. This event was the first edition, following the same event held by AKB48 and its local sister groups. The election determined the top 16 members with the most votes to fill 16 positions on two songs; the top 16 would be featured in the main single. The order of blocking (dancing position) was determined by the result of the vote from the fans. In this case, the number one position would place the member as the center on the single. The election result was revealed at the ANTV Epicentrum Studio Complex in South Jakarta and broadcast live on antv on 26 April 2014. All 40 of JKT48 members active as of 5 March 2014 participated. On 25 March, all 31 remaining members from the newly-introduced third generation members entered the contest.

The top 16 members were featured in the single "Gingham Check", released on 11 June 2014.

Timeline 
 5 March 2014: Voting period opened for serial numbers obtained from JKT48 single "Flying Get", JKT48 Official Fan Club privilege, and ballots distributed after every theater show.
 15 March 2014: First round results announcement
 16–22 March 2014: Voting period for serial numbers obtained by downloading the said single in the official mobile content menu.
 25 March 2014: Second round results announcement
 23 April 2014, midnight: Voting period closed at all
 26 April 2014: Final results announcement

Candidates 
All 40 JKT48 members active as of 5 March 2014 participated. On 25 March, all 31 remaining members from the newly-introduced third generation members entered the contest, making the number of candidates up to 71. As she was yet to officially join the group, AKB48 newly transferred-in member Rina Chikano did not participate in the election.

Election results

Post-election 
 Melody Nurramdhani Laksani became the center of a JKT48 single for the fifth time. By winning this election, she centered 5 out of 6 JKT48 singles at the time.
 Saktia Oktapyani became the only member to ever enter the top 32 as a "Trainee" in any phase, entering only in the first preliminary result.

2015 

JKT48 10th Single's Members Election was a chain of annual event to determine the selected members who would participate in the 10th single of idol group JKT48. This event was the second edition and the first to feature members ranked 17th to 32nd. It followed the same event held by AKB48 and its local sister groups. The election determined the top 32 members with the most votes to fill 32 positions on two songs; the top 16 would be featured in the main single and the rest on the coupling song. The order of blocking (dancing position) was determined by the result of the vote from the fans. In this case, the number one position would place the member as the center on the single. The election result was revealed at Tanah Airku Theater, inside the Taman Mini Indonesia Indah in East Jakarta, on 2 May 2015.

The top 16 members were featured in JKT48's 10th single, "Refrain Penuh Harapan" and the members ranked 17th to 32nd sang the B-side "Value Milikku Saja"; the recording was released on 27 May 2015.

Timeline 
 27 March 2015: Voting period opened for serial numbers obtained from JKT48 single "Pareo wa Emerald", JKT48 Official Fan Club privilege, and ballots distributed after every theater show.
 7 April 2015: First round results announcement
 8–12 April 2015: Voting period for serial numbers obtained by downloading the said single in the official mobile content menu.
 14 April 2015: Second round results announcement
 1 May 2015, midnight: Voting period closed at all
 2 May 2015: Final results announcement

Categorization 
The top 16 would sing the main single, while members ranked 17th to 32nd, called Under Girls, would sing the B-side.

Candidates 
All 64 JKT48 members active as of 27 March 2015 participated. This, as of the 2019 election, remains the only time when all of the group's active members were participating throughout the entire election process.

Election results

Post-election 

 Jessica Veranda solely became the center of a JKT48 single for the first time.
 Haruka Nakagawa recorded the highest finish for a non-Indonesian member (2nd).
 Andela Yuwono became the highest-ranked new entry and the highest-ranked non-Team J member by finishing fourth. Remarkably, this was only her second election participation and first full cycle election, having entered the election halfway through in 2014. This would be her last Senbatsu, as she resigned from the group later that year.
 For the first time there were more than one non-Indonesian member in the top 32: Nakagawa and Rina Chikano.
 Ayana Shahab became the first member to have a steady rank compared to the previous election (14th).
 The 7-point gap between Nabilah Ratna Ayu Azalia and Riskha Fairunissa broke the record for tightest margin set in the previous year between Nakagawa and 2nd-placed Jessica Veranda (9 points).
 Seventeen out of the top 32 members were new entries; the most in any JKT48 election as of 2019. Twelve of them went to Under Girls, also the most in such election.
 Five members made their first top 16 (and top 32) finish: Andela Yuwono, Priscillia Sari Dewi, Riskha Fairunissa, Sendy Ariani, and Gabriela Margareth Warouw. Only the first two were making their Senbatsu debut.
 Members with all-time high rank after this election (ever ranked at least twice) were Jessica Veranda, Haruka Nakagawa, Devi Kinal Putri, Ratu Vienny Fitrilya, Cindy Yuvia, Priscillia Sari Dewi, Michelle Christo Kusnadi, Gabriela Margareth Warouw, Sinka Juliani, Shinta Naomi, and Shani Indira Natio.
 Members with all-time low rank after this election (ever ranked at least twice) were Melody Nurramdhani Laksani, Shania Junianatha, Nabilah Ratna Ayu Azalia, Beby Chaesara Anadila, Ghaida Farisya, Thalia, Jennifer Hanna, Viviyona Apriani, and Jessica Vania.

2016 

JKT48 13th Single's Members Election was a chain of event to determine the selected members who would participate in the 13th single of idol group JKT48. This event was the third edition, having held annually since 2014. The election determined the top 32 members with the most votes to fill 32 positions on two songs; the top 16 would be featured in the main single and the rest on the coupling song. The order of blocking (dancing position) was determined by the result of the vote from the fans. In this case, the number one position would place the member as the center on the single. The election result was revealed at the Gelora Bung Karno Stadium in Central Jakarta on 7 May 2016 and broadcast live on RTV. This was one of the last events hosted by the stadium before its closure for renovation due to the 2018 Asian Games.

The top 16 members were featured in JKT48's 13th single, "Hanya Lihat ke Depan" and the members ranked 17th to 32nd sang the B-side "Tidak Boleh Pelukan"; the recording was released on 1 June 2016.

Timeline 
 23 March 2016: Voting period opened for serial numbers obtained from JKT48 album , JKT48 Official Fan Club privilege, and ballots distributed after every theater show.
 6 April 2016: First round results announcement
 7–17 April 2016: Voting period for serial numbers obtained by downloading the said album in the official mobile content menu.
 15 April 2016: Second round results announcement
 6 May 2016, midnight: Voting period closed at all
 7 May 2016: Final results announcement

Categorization 
The top 16 would sing the main single, while members ranked 17th to 32nd, called Under Girls, would sing the B-side.

Candidates 
60 of 64 JKT48 members active as of 23 March 2016 participated. Five members had announced their graduation earlier that year and all but Haruka Nakagawa did not participate in the election. Three of them would eventually leave the group amid the election process.

Election results

Post-election 
 Jessica Veranda became the first member to be reelected as center.
 Haruka Nakagawa became the first and – as of 2019 election – only member to contest the election after her graduation announcement. She also became the then-highest ranked non-Team J member by finishing third.
 For the first time there were more than one foreign member in the top 16: Nakagawa and Rina Chikano (both Japanese).
 Nadhifa Salsabila became the most-voted member who finished 32nd by obtaining 8,130 votes; as of 2019 election the record is still unbroken. The 3-point gap between her and 31st-placed Jessica Vania broke the record for tightest margin set in the previous year between Nabilah Ratna Ayu Azalia and Riskha Fairunissa (7 points).
 Nine out of the top 32 members were new entries; the then-least in any JKT48 election. Six went to Under Girls, three went to the Senbatsu, the then-record low for both in such election.
 Six members made their first top 16 finish: Rina Chikano, Shania Gracia, Michelle Christo Kusnadi, Dena Siti Rohyati, Dwi Putri Bonita, and Thalia Ivanka Elizabeth. Gracia, Dena, and Thalia Ivanka made their first top 32 finish; the first two and Putri Bonita were making their Senbatsu debut. This would be the only Senbatsu appearance for the Dena and Putri Bonita.
 Members with all-time high rank after this election (ever ranked at least twice) were Ghaida Farisya, Cindy Yuvia, Priscillia Sari Dewi, Rina Chikano, Michelle Christo Kusnadi, Gabriela Margareth Warouw, Sinka Juliani, Shinta Naomi, and Shani Indira Natio.
 Members with all-time low rank after this election (ever ranked at least twice) were Haruka Nakagawa (joint-worst), Melody Nurramdhani Laksani, Shania Junianatha (joint-worst), Devi Kinal Putri, Ayana Shahab, Riskha Fairunissa, Beby Chaesara Anadila, Sendy Ariani, Ratu Vienny Fitrilya, Viviyona Apriani, and Jessica Vania.

2017 

JKT48 17th Single's Members Election was a chain of event to determine the selected members who would participate in the 17th single of idol group JKT48. This event was the fourth edition, having held annually since 2014. The election determined the top 32 members with the most votes to fill 32 positions on two songs; the top 16 would be featured in the main single and the rest on the coupling song. The order of blocking (dancing position) was determined by the result of the vote from the fans. In this case, the number one position would place the member as the center on the single. The election result was revealed at the Balai Sarbini in South Jakarta on 22 April 2017 and broadcast live on RTV.

The top 16 members were featured in JKT48's 17th single, "Indahnya Senyum Manismu..." and the members ranked 17th to 32nd sang the B-side "Sedikit Saja I Love You!"; the recording was released in music card on 8 June 2017 and in CD-DVD on 4 August 2017.

Timeline 
 8 March 2017: Voting period opened for serial numbers obtained from JKT48 single "So Long!", greatest hits album "JKT48 Festival Greatest Hits", JKT48 Official Fan Club privilege, and ballots distributed after every theater show.
 18 March 2017: First round results announcement
 1 April 2017: Second round results announcement
 3–7 April 2017: Period for obtaining serial numbers by downloading the said single in the official mobile content menu.
 3–9 April 2017: Voting period for serial numbers obtained by downloading from the official mobile content menu.
 21 April 2017, midnight: Voting period closed at all
 22 April 2017: Final results announcement

Categorization 
The top 16 would sing the main single, while members ranked 17th to 32nd, called Under Girls, would sing the B-side.

Candidates 
64 out of 66 individual JKT48 members active as of 8 March 2017 participated. The two remaining, Jessica Vania and Jessica Veranda, had announced their graduation earlier that year and thus did not participate in the election. Melody Nurramdhani Laksani was stated twice in the source (counted once here) due to her dual-membership back then.

Election results

Post-election 
 Shani Indira Natio became the first non-Team J member and the maiden non-first generation member to be elected as center. She also became the first third generation member to center any JKT48 single. Hopping 25 ranks from the 2016 election, she also broke the record of best progress for any members elected consecutively to the top 32, as well as best progress for election winners.
 For the first time there was no Team J member in the top two.
 The elected centers for both Senbatsu and Under Girls were from the same generation for the first time (3rd generation).
 Twelve out of the top 32 members were new entries; the then-most in any JKT48 election when the preceding edition was also using the 32-rank system. Ten went to Under Girls, two went to the Senbatsu, the record low for the latter in such election.
 Five members made their first top 16 finish: Made Devi Ranita Ningtara, Saktia Oktapyani, Aninditha Rahma Cahyadi, Rona Anggreani, and Frieska Anastasia Laksani. Made Devi and Aninditha made the top 32 for the first time. Only Made Devi and Rona who were not making their Senbatsu debut.
 Members with all-time high rank after this election (ever ranked at least twice) were Shani Indira Natio, Ayana Shahab, Shania Gracia, Rina Chikano, Saktia Oktapyani, Rona Anggreani, Frieska Anastasia Laksani, Maria Genoveva Natalia Desy Purnamasari Gunawan, Della Delila, and Lidya Maulida Djuhandar.
 Members with all-time low rank after this election (ever ranked at least twice) were Dena Siti Rohyati, Nabilah Ratna Ayu Azalia, Devi Kinal Putri, and Shania Junianatha.

2018 

JKT48 20th Single's Members Election was a chain of event to determine the selected members who would participate in the 20th single of idol group JKT48. This event was the fifth edition, having held annually since 2014. The election determined the top 32 members with the most votes to fill 32 positions on two songs; the top 16 would be featured in the main single and the rest on the coupling song. The order of blocking (dancing position) was determined by the result of the vote from the fans. In this case, the number one position would place the member as the center on the single. The election result was revealed at Sleman City Hall in Sleman, Yogyakarta Special Region on 17 November 2018; for the first time the final result announcement was not held in Jakarta. It was emceed by former news anchor-turned-host   and Hana Qosim.

The top 16 members sang in JKT48's 20th single, "High Tension" and the members ranked 17th to 32nd sang the B-side "Musim yang Selanjutnya"; the recording was released in January and February 2019.

Timeline 
 8 September 2018: Voting period opened for serial numbers obtained from JKT48 double single "UZA / Everyday, Kachuusha", JKT48 Circus music cards, JKT48 Official Fan Club privilege, and ballots distributed after every theater show.
 29 September 2018: First round results announcement
 30 September 2018: Release of Saka Agari music card, accompanied with serial numbers.
 26 October 2018: Second round results announcement
 5–9 November 2018: Period for obtaining serial numbers by downloading a song in the official mobile content menu.
 15 November 2018, midnight: Voting period closed at all
 17 November 2018: Final results announcement

Categorization 
The top 16 would sing the main single, while members ranked 17th to 32nd, called Under Girls, would sing the B-side.

Candidates 
55 out of 60 JKT48 members active as of 8 September 2018 participated. The other five had announced their graduation earlier that year and thus did not participate in the election. Two of them would eventually leave the group amid the election process. This was the first JKT48 election to not feature a Japanese national.

On 1 November 2018, Putri Cahyaning Anggraini became the first member to ever drop her candidacy. She was dismissed by the management.

On 2 November 2018, twelve seventh-generation members who had been promoted to the Class A of the Academy entered the election. When the voting period was over, there were 66 out of 76 members still in the race. The additional 7 members not participating were the remaining seventh generation members, who were still in the Class B of the Academy.

Election results

Post-election 

 Cindy Yuvia became the fourth distinctive election winner. She also became the then-most voted member in a single election and created the then-highest winning margin (20,377 votes). She also became the first and eventually the last second generation member to win the election, as well as the only member to consistently finish in the top 16 in each of the first five elections.
 Third-placed Sinka Juliani broke the record of best progress for any members who were not in the top 32 in the previous election.
 Fourth-place finisher Feni Fitriyanti equaled the record for highest finish by a new entry. The record was set by Andela Yuwono in 2015. However, Feni finished as high in her fifth attempt; Andela was only in her second participation and first full cycle election.
 For the first time there were Academy members (formerly called Trainees) elected to the top 32. Gabryela Marcelina became only the second Academy member to be a Senbatsu and the first since Adriani Elisabeth in "Love Trip" (2016).
 The elected centers for both Senbatsu and Under Girls were from the same generation for the second consecutive time (2nd generation), and the first not to come from 3rd generation.
 Adhisty Zara set the record as the least-voted top 32 member by getting 1,867 votes. The previous record-holder was Shani Indira Natio who also finished 32nd but earned 3,710 votes (2015), nearly twice as much.
 Eight out of the top 32 members were new entries; the least in any JKT48 election. This was split evenly between Under Girls and the Senbatsu, the record low for the former in such election.
 Seven members made their first top 16 finish: Sinka Juliani, Feni Fitriyanti, Nurhayati, Ayu Safira Oktaviani, Stephanie Pricilla Indarto Putri, Jinan Safa Safira, and Gabryela Marcelina. Feni, Stephanie, Jinan, and Gabryela made their first top 32 finish. Only Ayu and Gabryela who were making their Senbatsu debut.
 Group captain Shania Junianatha reached her new all-time low election result, which was – as of 2019 election – the only time a sitting group captain failed to finish in the top 16. During her acceptance speech, she announced her graduation.
 Other members with all-time low rank after this election (ever ranked at least twice) were Adhisty Zara, Gabriela Margareth Warouw, Frieska Anastasia Laksani, Natalia, Cindy Hapsari Maharani Pujiantoro Putri, Nadila Cindi Wantari, Tan Zhi Hui Celine, Thalia Ivanka Elizabeth, and Aninditha Rahma Cahyadi.
 Members with all-time high rank after this election (ever ranked at least twice) were Cindy Yuvia, Sinka Juliani, Nurhayati, Ayu Safira Oktaviani, Maria Genoveva Natalia Desy Purnamasari Gunawan, and Melati Putri Rahel Sesilia.

2019 

JKT48 Original Single's Members Election was a chain of event to determine the selected members who would participate in the 21st single; the first original (Indonesian-made rather than translated from Japanese) single of idol group JKT48. This event was the sixth edition, having held annually since 2014. The election determined the top 32 members with the most votes to fill 32 positions on two songs; the top 16 would be featured in the main single and the rest on the coupling song. The order of blocking (dancing position) was determined by the result of the vote from the fans. In this case, the number one position would place the member as the center on the single. The election result was revealed at BRP SMESCO Convention Hall in South Jakarta. It was emceed by actor and famous host from teen shows Planet Remaja antv,  and Yesica Amami.

The top 16 members sang in JKT48's 21st single and first original single, "" (Rhapsody) and the members ranked 17th to 32nd sang the B-side "Sweet & Bitter"; the CD and DVD set was released on 29 February 2020 following the music card release on 22 January 2020.

Timeline 
 14 September 2019: Voting period opened for serial numbers obtained from records (CD+DVDs and music cards)
 5 October 2019: First round results announcement
 9 October 2019: Release of JOY KICK! TEARS music card, accompanied with serial numbers.
 3 November 2019: Second round results announcement
 20–25 November 2019: Period for obtaining serial numbers by downloading the song "Otona Ressha" in the official mobile content menu.
 28 November 2019, midnight: Voting period closed at all, it was later postponed for 12 hours due to technical issues.
 30 November 2019: Final results announcement

Categorization 
The top 16 sang the original, main single titled "" (Rhapsody). The members ranked 17th to 32nd, called Under Girls, sang the B-side, "Sweet & Bitter".

Candidates 
66 out of 78 individual JKT48 members active as of 14 September 2019 participated. Twelve members had announced their graduation earlier that year and thus did not participate in the election. Three of them would eventually leave the group amid the election process. Aninditha Rahma Cahyadi was stated twice in the source (counted once here) due to her dual-membership back then.

Election results

Post-election 

 Shani Indira Natio became the new most-voted member in a single election and broke the record for highest winning margin (28,273 votes). She also became the first non-Team J member to be reelected as center, and also the first center to be reelected non-consecutively.
 By finishing 3rd, Riska Amelia Putri broke the record for highest finish by a new entry. The previous record was set by Andela Yuwono in 2015 (4th) and was equaled by Feni Fitriyanti in 2018. However, Feni finished as high in her fifth attempt; Andela and Riska were only in their second participation and the former was in her first full cycle election.
 Finishing eighth, Beby Chaesara Anadila became the first and only member to be ranked in all six JKT48 elections. She was already the only ranked member in the first election (2014) to participate this year.
 The elected centers for both Senbatsu and Under Girls were from the same generation for the third consecutive time (3rd generation), and the first time that the same generation won both centers more than once (previously in 2017).
 Fourteen out of the top 32 members were new entries; the most in any JKT48 election when the preceding edition was also using the 32-rank system. Nine went to Under Girls, five went to the Senbatsu, the joint-record high for the latter in such election.
 Seven members made their Senbatsu debut by finishing in the top 16, which also their first top 16 finish: Riska Amelia Putri, Nadila Cindi Wantari, Tan Zhi Hui Celine, Angelina Christy, Diani Amalia Ramadhani, Helisma Putri, and Viona Fadrin. Remarkably, this was only the second election participation for Riska, Christy, Helisma, and Viona. These four members, along with Diani, made their first ever top 32 finish as well. Malaysian national Tan Zhi Hui Celine's finish (9th) marked Rapsodi as the first JKT48 single to feature a member who is neither Japanese nor Indonesian.
 For the second consecutive time there were Academy members (formerly called Trainees) elected to the top 32. With three, this was the most of all time; having had only two in 2018 and none before. Earning 14,566 votes, Viona Fadrin became the most-voted Academy member, surpassing Gabryela Marcelina (13,587), who also finished 16th in 2018.
 Members with all-time high rank after this election (ever ranked at least twice) were Feni Fitriyanti, Nurhayati, Nadila Cindi Wantari, Gabryela Marcelina, Cindy Hapsari Maharani Pujiantoro Putri, Tan Zhi Hui Celine, Melati Putri Rahel Sesilia, Jinan Safa Safira, Maria Genoveva Natalia Desy Purnamasari Gunawan, and Ni Made Ayu Vania Aurellia.
 Members with all-time low rank after this election (ever ranked at least twice) were Fidly Immanda Azzahra and Aninditha Rahma Cahyadi.

Statistics

References 

JKT48
2014 establishments in Indonesia
Annual events in Indonesia